Bangor Township, Michigan may refer to:

 Bangor Township, Bay County, Michigan
 Bangor Township, Van Buren County, Michigan

See also 
 Bangor, Michigan, a city in Van Buren County
 Bangor Township (disambiguation)

Michigan township disambiguation pages